Vyacheslav Akimov (born 17 October 1989 in Odessa, Ukrainian SSR) is a professional Ukrainian football midfielder who played for FC Desna Chernihiv in the Ukrainian First League.

Career
Akimov is product of Youth Sportive School #9 Odessa.

He made his début in the Ukrainian Premier League, played for FC Volyn Lutsk in the game against FC Obolon Kyiv on 26 August 2012.

References

External links
Profile at FFU Official Site (Ukr)

1989 births
Living people
Footballers from Odesa
Ukrainian footballers
FC Helios Kharkiv players
MFC Mykolaiv players
FC Knyazha Shchaslyve players
FC Enerhetyk Burshtyn players
FC Hoverla Uzhhorod players
FC Volyn Lutsk players
Ukrainian Premier League players
FC Shakhtar-3 Donetsk players
FC Veris Chișinău players
FC Mariupol players
Ukrainian expatriate footballers
Expatriate footballers in Moldova
Ukrainian expatriate sportspeople in Moldova
FC Desna Chernihiv players
FC Zhemchuzhyna Odesa players
FC Viktoriya Mykolaivka players
Association football midfielders